Almodis de la Marche ( 1020 – 16 October 1071) was a French noble.  She was famed for her marriage career, in particularly for her third marriage to Ramon Berenguer I, Count of Barcelona, with whom she committed double bigamy in 1053, for which the Pope had them excommunicated.

Life
Almodis was the daughter of Count Bernard I of Marche and wife Amélie. She married Hugh V of Lusignan around 1038 and they had two sons and one daughter. Almodis and Hugh of Lusignan divorced due to consanguinity. She later, with Hugh's assistance, married Count Pons of Toulouse in 1040. Almodis was still Pons' wife in April 1053, when she was abducted by Count Ramon Berenguer I of Barcelona. He kidnapped her from Narbonne with the aid of a fleet sent north by his ally, the Muslim emir of Tortosa. They married immediately (despite the fact both of her previous husbands were still alive) and they appear with their twin sons in a charter the next year. Pope Victor II excommunicated Almodis and Ramon for this illegal marriage until 1056.

Almodis maintained contact with her former husbands and many children, and in 1066/1067 she traveled to Toulouse for her daughter's wedding. A few years before, in 1060, Hugh V of Lusignan had revolted against his lord, Duke William VIII of Aquitaine, in support of Almodis' son William IV of Toulouse. Her sons supported one another in military campaigns; Hugh VI of Lusignan, Raymond IV of Toulouse, and Berenguer Ramon II of Barcelona all took the Cross.

Her third husband Ramon was married to her niece, Isabela Trencavel, the daughter of Rangearde de la Marche. Their son, Peter Raymundi, was Ramon's original heir. Peter Raymundi resented Almodis' influence and was concerned she was trying to replace him with her own two sons, his consanguineous nephews, both who had claims through their father, Count La Marche. He murdered her in October 1071. William of Malmesbury reflected that she was, "sad, [of] unbridled lewdness".

Pere-Ramon was disinherited and exiled for his crime and fled the country. When his father died in 1076, Barcelona was split between Almodis' sons, Berenguer Ramon and Ramon Berenguer. The family history of murder did not end with Pere-Ramon, as Berenguer Ramon earned his nickname "The Fratricide" when he killed his own twin brother.

Family
She married Hugh V of Lusignan around 1038 and they had two sons and one daughter:
 Hugh VI of Lusignan (c. 1039–1101)
 Jordan de Lusignan
 Mélisende de Lusignan (b. bef. 1055), married before 1074 to Simon I "l'Archevêque", Vidame de Parthenay

Almodis and Hugh of Lusignan divorced due to consanguinity, and Hugh arranged for her to marry Count Pons of Toulouse in 1040. Together they produced several children, including:
 William IV of Toulouse
 Raymond IV of Toulouse
 Hugh, Abbot of Saint-Gilles
 Almodis of Toulouse, married Count Pierre of Melgueil

In 1053, she married Ramon Berenguer I, Count of Barcelona. Together they produced four children:
 Berenguer Ramon II, Count of Barcelona
 Ramon Berenguer II, Count of Barcelona
 Agnes of Barcelona, married Count Guigues II of Albon
 Sancha of Barcelona, married Count Guillermo Ramon I of Cerdagne

Notes

Sources

46

Almodis
Countesses of Toulouse
Countesses of Barcelona
People excommunicated by the Catholic Church
1020s births
1071 deaths
Burials at Barcelona Cathedral
11th-century Spanish women
11th-century French women
11th-century people from the County of Barcelona